Battle Monument may refer to:

 Battle Monument, a monument in downtown Baltimore, Maryland
 Battle Monument (West Point), a monument at the United States Military Academy in West Point, New York
 Battle Monument, Trenton, New Jersey, a neighborhood in Trenton, New Jersey